LaVal's disk-winged bat (Thyroptera lavali) is a species of bat in the family Thyropteridae. It is native to Ecuador, Colombia, Peru, Venezuela and Brazil where it has been found near streams in tropical rainforest. The bat is insectivorous. It is poorly studied but is believed to be rare. The species was named in honor of American zoologist Richard K. LaVal.

References

Thyropteridae
Mammals of Peru
Mammals of Ecuador
Bats of South America
Mammals described in 1993